The rock carvings at Åsli are located near the Malangen in Balsfjord municipality in Norway comprise at least 15 figures in poor condition. The figures are from a hunting culture.

The rock carvings
At least eight of the figures are of reindeer. There are also figures of porpoise, a boat, and possibly a moose.

The carvers
The carvings are from a hunting culture (veidekultur).

How to get there
The field is on a rock (svaberg) by a water fall on the river starting from Nordfjordvatnet, above the 
Åsli farm that is in Nordfjorden about 1 km from Storsteinnes in Balsfjord. Due to the poor condition of the figures they can be difficult to spot.

References
 The article was based on information at http://www.arild-hauge.com/helleristning.htm, which cites:
Unknown title. Povl Simonsen. 1958.
Fortidsminner nord for polarsirkelen. Povl Simonsen. Universitetesforlaget, Tromsø-Oslo-Bergen. 1970.

See also
Petroglyph
Pre-historic art
Rock carvings at Tennes
List of rock carvings in Norway

Asli
Culture in Troms
Prehistory of the Arctic
History of Troms
Balsfjord